Richard McSherry (November 21, 1817 – October 7, 1885) was an American physician, one of the founders of the Baltimore Academy of Medicine and its first president.

Life
Born on November 21, 1817 in Martinsburg, West Virginia (then apart of Virginia, he was educated at Georgetown College and at the University of Maryland, and received the degree of M. D. at the University of Pennsylvania in 1841. Being appointed assistant surgeon on the medical corps of the U.S. Army on 21 August 1838, he served under General Zachary Taylor in the Second Seminole War and resigned his commission on 30 April 1840.

From 1843 to 1856 he served as assistant surgeon in the U.S. Navy, and after that practised medicine in Baltlmore until 1883. He died there on 7 October 1885.

Works
He contributed to medical journals, and was also the author of "El Puchero or a Mixed Dish from Mexico" (1850); "Essays" (1869), and "Health and How to Promote It" (1883).

Family
He was the son of Dr. Richard McSherry and Catherine Ann (King) McSherry. He married Catherine Somerville Wilson, daughter of Robert Wilson of Baltimore, in 1842.

References

Attribution

1817 births
1885 deaths
United States Navy Medical Corps officers
Physicians from West Virginia
People from Martinsburg, West Virginia
American surgeons
Writers from West Virginia
American medical writers
American male non-fiction writers
Perelman School of Medicine at the University of Pennsylvania alumni
Georgetown College (Georgetown University) alumni